The Vala are a Rajput clan found in the state of Gujarat in India. They claim to be the earliest Rajput settlers in Saurashtra, and are descendants of Shiladitya, the Valabhi ruler of Gujarat. After the overthrow of Valabhi, the Valas settled in the south western Saurashtra, which is known as Valak, after the clan. A few live in villages near the town of Mahuva, in a village  Nanivavdi near the town Ranpur, Sathara near the town Mahuva and in SARKHADI, KADODARA and KADVASAN in Kodinar area and also in a village of Khadol near the town Dhandhuka.They are also found in some villages like Chareliya, Gadhethad, Diu (Union territory) and most of the parts of Upleta taluka. They were one of the greatest clans in India but as India became independent they had to live normal life as landowners.

References

Rajput clans of Gujarat